George Washington is a statue of George Washington, by Joseph A. Bailly at Independence Hall, Philadelphia on Chestnut street between 5th and 6th streets.

The white marble original, installed on the north side of Independence Hall, was dedicated on July 2, 1869, by mayor Daniel M. Fox. It is now located in Conversation Hall, Philadelphia City Hall.

A bronze replica replaced the original, and was dedicated in October 1910.

See also
 List of monuments dedicated to George Washington
 List of statues of George Washington
 List of public art in Philadelphia
 List of sculptures of presidents of the United States

References

1869 establishments in Pennsylvania
1869 sculptures
1910 establishments in Pennsylvania
1910 sculptures
Artworks in the collection of the National Park Service
Bronze sculptures in Pennsylvania
Independence National Historical Park
Marble sculptures in Pennsylvania
Monuments and memorials in Philadelphia
Outdoor sculptures in Philadelphia
Sculptures of men in Pennsylvania
Statues in Pennsylvania
Statues of George Washington
Monuments and memorials to George Washington in the United States